Trickett is a surname. Notable people with the surname include: 

Anthony Trickett (1940–2013), Scottish doctor
Clint Trickett (born 1991), American football player
Edward Trickett (1851–1916), Australian rower
Jon Trickett (born 1950), English politician
Libby Trickett (née Lenton) (born 1985), Australian swimmer
Luke Trickett, swimmer
Rachel Trickett (1923–1999), English novelist and academic
Sam Trickett (born 1986), English poker player
Vicki Trickett (born 1938), American actress
William Trickett (1843–1916), Australian politician

See also
 Daniel Trickett-Smith (born 1995), English footballer
 Mount Trickett, a mountain on the Great Dividing Range
 Trickett & Webb, London-based graphic design agency
 Trickett's Cross, an estate situated on the outskirts of Ferndown, Dorset, England
 William Trickett Smith (born 1938), chairman of the Dauphin County Republican Committee
 William Trickett Smith II (born 1981), American murderer